Toad is the debut album by the Swiss rock band also called Toad. It was engineered by British producer Martin Birch. After the recording finished, singer Benjamin Jaeger left the group and was not replaced.

Track listing

 "Cottonwood Hill" (music – Frohlich, lyrics – Jaeger) 8:35
 "A Life That Ain't Worth Living" (music & lyrics – Vergeat) 3:30
 "Tank" (music & lyrics – Vergeat) 3:28
 "They Say I'm Mad" (music – Vergeat, lyrics – Frohlich) 6:47
 "Life Goes On" (music – Frohlich, lyrics – Jaeger) 11:58
 "Pig's Walk" (music & lyrics – Vergeat) 7:26
 "The One I Mean" (music – Vergeat, lyrics – Frohlich) 2:33
 "Stay" (music – Vergeat & Frohlich, lyrics – Frohlich & Jaeger) 3:32

Personnel

 Vic Vergeat – guitar
 Werner Frohlich – bass
 Cosimo Lampis – drums
 Benjamin Jaeger – vocals
 Produced by Chris Schwegler
 Engineered by Martin Birch

References

1971 debut albums
Toad (band) albums